The 1947–48 Football League season was Birmingham City Football Club's 45th in the Football League and their 19th in the Second Division. They reached first place in the 22-team division after the match played on 6 December and retained that position for the remainder of the season, winning the Second Division title for the third time and gaining promotion to the First Division for 1948–49, from which they had been relegated at the end of the last completed pre-war season. They entered the 1947–48 FA Cup at the third round proper and lost to Notts County in that round.

Twenty-four players made at least one appearance in nationally organised competition, and there were twelve different goalscorers. Forward Frank Mitchell missed only one of the 43 games over the season, and Harold Bodle was leading scorer with 14 goals, all of which came in the league.

Football League Second Division

League table (part)

FA Cup

Appearances and goals

Players with name struck through and marked  left the club during the playing season.

See also
Birmingham City F.C. seasons

References
General
 
 
 Source for match dates and results: 
 Source for lineups, appearances, goalscorers and attendances: Matthews (2010), Complete Record, pp. 330–31.
 Source for kit: "Birmingham City". Historical Football Kits. Retrieved 22 May 2018.

Specific

Birmingham City F.C. seasons
Birmingham